The rusty-tinged antpitta (Grallaria przewalskii) is a species of bird in the family Grallariidae.
It is endemic to Peru.

Its natural habitats are subtropical or tropical moist montane forest and heavily degraded former forest.

References

rusty-tinged antpitta
Birds of the Peruvian Andes
Endemic birds of Peru
rusty-tinged antpitta
rusty-tinged antpitta
Taxonomy articles created by Polbot